Phyllocnistis chlorantica is a moth of the family Gracillariidae, known from the Russian Far East. The hostplant for the species is Chloranthus japonicus.

References

Phyllocnistis
Endemic fauna of Russia